Giacinto Maria Conigli, O.P. (1621–1704) was a Roman Catholic prelate who served as Bishop of Cefalonia e Zante (1675–1704).

Biography
Giacinto Maria Conigli was born in Venice, Italy in 1621 and ordained a priest in the Order of Preachers.
On 6 May 1675, he was appointed during the papacy of Pope Clement X as Bishop of Cefalonia e Zante.
On 26 May 1675, he was consecrated bishop by Pietro Francesco Orsini de Gravina, Archbishop of Manfredonia, with Francesco Maria Vignola, Bishop of Minervino Murge, and Raffaele Riario Di Saono, Bishop of Montepeloso, serving as co-consecrators. 
He served as Bishop of Cefalonia e Zante until his resignation on 7 Oct 1694. 
He died in 1704.

References 

17th-century Roman Catholic bishops in the Republic of Venice
18th-century Roman Catholic bishops in the Republic of Venice
Bishops appointed by Pope Clement X
1621 births
1704 deaths
Dominican bishops